The Hueneme School District is a school district headquartered in Port Hueneme, California, United States. The district serves elementary and junior high school students (grades K–8) in portions of the cities of Port Hueneme and Oxnard as well as adjacent unincorporated areas of Ventura County.

The district feeds into the Oxnard Union High School District, specifically Channel Islands and Hueneme high schools.

History
E.O Green Junior High School, their first school, opened in 1960.

In 2008, 15-year old E.O Green Junior High School student Larry King was murdered by a fellow student, 14-year old Brandon Mclnerney, with a revolver in reaction to incidents where King publicly made advances towards Mclnerney.

Schools

Junior high schools
(6-8)
 Charles Blackstock Junior High School (Oxnard)
 E.O. Green Junior High School (opened 1960) (Oxnard)

Elementary schools
(K-6)
 Richard Bard Elementary School (Port Hueneme)
 Julien Hathaway Elementary School (Oxnard)
 Hollywood Beach Elementary School (Channel Islands Beach)
 Hueneme Elementary School (Port Hueneme)
(K-5)
 Art Haycox Elementary School (Oxnard)
 Ansgar Larsen Elementary School (Oxnard)
 Parkview Elementary School (Port Hueneme)
 Sunkist Elementary School (Port Hueneme)
 Fred L. Williams Elementary School (Oxnard)

References

External links

School districts in Ventura County, California
Port Hueneme, California
Education in Oxnard, California